George Morgan Magan, Baron Magan of Castletown (born 14 November 1945), is a former Conservative member of the House of Lords of the United Kingdom who was declared bankrupt in September 2020. He comes from an Anglo-Irish family, and is the son of the late Brigadier Bill Magan, who served as a director at MI5. He was educated at Winchester College and then became a Chartered Accountant.

Legal Issues
In 2017, Lord Magan of Castletown obtained a loan from a fellow peer, Lord Ashcroft, to avoid a bankruptcy application in London.

In 2018, he was ordered to pay €572,000 in rent arrears.

In September 2019, Magan was evicted from Castletown Cox for failure to make rental payments of €100,000 per annum to the trust he had placed the estate into, which had sold the property for a reported €19m in 2018. The High Court in Dublin ruled that Lord Magan of Castletown was not entitled to a new tenancy of the Castletown Cox mansion. Unable to pay his lawyers, there was some evidence of a legal move against his residence in London.

In October 2019, the High Court in London sentenced Magan to one week imprisonment, suspended for six weeks, after ruling that he was in contempt of court for failing to provide all the information requested about his finances, adding "His current attitude, that this seems to be a wholly voluntary process, is highly mistaken."

On 8 September 2020, Lord Magan of Castletown was declared bankrupt by the High Court of Justice in London.

In December 2020, Magan lost his appeal in the Irish High Court to overturn his eviction from Castletown Cox. Ms Justice Faherty, on behalf of the three-judge Court of Appeal, dismissed the appeal. She said the defendant had not shown he had a good defence on the merits or had a defence with a reasonable prospect of success.

House of Lords
On 25 January 2011, Magan was created a life peer as The Baron Magan of Castletown, of Kensington in the Royal Borough of Kensington and Chelsea, and was introduced in the House of Lords on 27 January 2011, where he sat as a Conservative.

Lord Magan of Castletown is currently ineligible to actually sit in the House of Lords.

In January 2021, the House of Lords Conduct Committee convened as Lord Magan of Castletown had failed to notify the committee of his suspended sentence of imprisonment in 2019. Lord Mance, Chairman of the House of Lords Conduct Committee, observed that Magan was in breach of the House of Lords Code of Conduct Section 18.

References

1945 births
Living people
Conservative Party (UK) life peers
People educated at Winchester College
Conservative Party (UK) officials
People named in the Paradise Papers
Life peers created by Elizabeth II